Edmund N. "Ned" Carpenter II (1921–2008) was president of Richards, Layton & Finger, a law firm located in Wilmington, Delaware. He earned a BA at Princeton, where he later established the Edmund N. Carpenter II Professorship, then graduated from Harvard Law School, in 1948. His widow, philanthropist Carroll M. Carpenter, established the Edmund N. and Carroll M. Carpenter Professorship in Psychiatry at Harvard Medical School.

Carpenter led a behind-enemy-lines rescue of seven American airmen from Dien Bien Phu in Indochina in March, 1945. In August, 1945 he helped return several Doolittle Raiders who had been held as POWs since 1942 by the Japanese. He earned a Bronze Star for his service in World War II, and was a past president of the Delaware State Bar Association and of the American Judicature Society. Carpenter died on December 19, 2008.

Essays
In 1938, while a 17-year-old student in Lawrenceville, NJ, Carpenter wrote an essay entitled "Before I die...", setting out the things he hoped to achieve in his life. The essay was read at his 2008 funeral by one of his daughters, Katie Carpenter. The essay achieved some acclaim, and was later reprinted in several newspapers, including The Wall Street Journal.

References

External links
 Citation for Professionalism Award, 2003
 First Hand Account of Meeting with Edmund Carpenter II, by Daphne Oz
 Before I Die Essay, in Wall Street Journal
 Obituary at American Judicature Society

20th-century American lawyers
2008 deaths
1921 births
Harvard Law School alumni
Princeton University alumni
American military personnel of World War II